Hanger Hill Wood is a small remnant of ancient woodland to the east of the Hanger Hill Park and North Circular Road at Hanger Lane, in Ealing in the London Borough of Ealing. Named from 'Hangra', the Old English word for wooded slope. There is access from Hanger Lane (at pedestrian crossing by Hillcrest Road), alternative access is at several points on Chatsworth Road.

Wildlife 

This site contains a variety of woodland native plants including Pedunculate oaks (Quercus robur), European beech (Fagus sylvatica), European yew (Taxus baccata), European holly (Ilex aquifolium), European ivy (Hedera helix) and other tree species.

Breeding birds include common wood pigeons (Columba palumbus), common blackbirds (Turdus merula), Eurasian blue tits (Cyanistes caeruleus), common starlings (Sturnus vulgaris) and invasive rose-ringed parakeets (Psittacula krameri).

Mammal species include red foxes (Vulpes vulpes), European hedgehogs (Erinaceus europaeus), invasive grey squirrels (Sciurus carolinensis).

See also 
 Fox Wood

References

Ancient woods of London
English royal forests
Forests and woodlands of London
History of London
London Wildlife Trust
Parks and open spaces in London
Sites of Special Scientific Interest in London
Special Areas of Conservation in England
Urban forests in the United Kingdom